Republicanism in Australia is a popular movement to change Australia's system of government from a constitutional parliamentary monarchy to a republic, replacing the monarch of Australia (currently Charles III) with a president. Republicanism was first espoused in Australia before Federation in 1901. After a period of decline after Federation, the movement again became prominent at the end of the 20th century after successive legal and socio-cultural changes loosened Australia's ties with the United Kingdom.

Politically, republicanism is officially supported by the Labor Party and the Greens and is also supported by some Liberal Party members of the Australian Parliament. There has been an assistant minister for the republic since June 2022. In a referendum held in 1999, Australian voters rejected a proposal to establish a republic with a parliamentary appointed head of state. This was despite polls showing a majority of Australians supported the idea of a republic at the time.

History

Before federation

In his journal The Currency Lad, first published in Sydney in 1832, pastoralist and politician Horatio Wills was the first person to openly espouse Australian republicanism. Born to a convict father, Wills was devoted to the emancipist cause and promoted the interests of "currency lads and lasses" (Australian-born Europeans).

Some leaders and participants of the revolt at the Eureka Stockade in 1854 held republican views and the incident has been used to encourage republicanism in subsequent years, with the Eureka Flag appearing in connection with some republican groups. The Australian Republican Association (ARA) was founded in response to the Eureka Stockade, advocating the abolition of governors and their titles, the revision of the penal code, payment of members of parliament, the nationalisation of land and an independent federal Australian republic outside of the British Empire. David Flint, the national convener of Australians for Constitutional Monarchy, notes that a movement emerged in favour of a "White Australia" policy; however British authorities in Whitehall were opposed to segregational laws. He suggests that to circumvent Westminster, those in favour of the discriminatory policies backed the proposed secession from the Empire as a republic. One attendee of the ARA meetings was the Australian-born poet Henry Lawson, who wrote his first poem, entitled A Song of the Republic, in The Republican journal.

Federation and decline
At the Australian Federation Convention, which produced the first draft that was to become the Australian constitution 1891, a former Premier of New South Wales, George Dibbs, described as the "inevitable destiny of the people of this great country" the establishment of "the Republic of Australia". The fervour of republicanism tailed off in the 1890s as the labour movement became concerned with the Federation of Australia. The republican movement dwindled further during and after World War I. Emotionally, patriotic support for the war effort went hand in hand with a renewal of loyalty to the monarchy. The Bulletin abandoned republicanism and became a conservative, Empire loyalist paper. The Returned and Services League formed in 1916 and became an important bastion of monarchist sentiment.

The conservative parties were fervently monarchist and although the Labor Party campaigned for greater Australian independence within the Empire and generally supported the appointment of Australians as governor-general, it did not question the monarchy itself. Under the Labor government of John Curtin, a member of the Royal Family, Prince Henry, Duke of Gloucester, was appointed governor-general during World War II. The royal tour of Queen Elizabeth II in 1954 saw a reported 7 million Australians (out of a total population of 9 million) out to see her.

Whitlam era
The Whitlam government ended in 1975 with a constitutional crisis in which Governor-General John Kerr dismissed Whitlam's ministry and appointed Opposition Leader Malcolm Fraser as prime minister. The incident raised questions about the value of maintaining a supposedly "symbolic" office that still possessed many key constitutional powers and what an Australian president with the same reserve powers would do in a similar situation. Correspondence between Kerr and Martin Charteris, the Queen's private secretary, were declassified by the Australian National Archives in 2020 and show that Kerr did not inform the palace ahead of time of his decision to dismiss the prime minister. They do reveal however, that Kerr sought advice from the palace about his constitutional obligations and concerns about a "race to the palace" should Whitlam attempt to advise the queen to dismiss the governor general before the governor general dismissed Whitlam.

Australia Act and other changes
References to the monarchy were removed from various institutions through the late 1980s and 1990s. For example, in 1993, the Oath of Citizenship, which included an assertion of allegiance to the Australian monarch, was replaced by a pledge to be loyal to "Australia and its people". Earlier, in 1990, the formula of enactment for the Parliament of Australia was changed from "Be it enacted by the Queen, and the Senate, and the House of Representatives of the Commonwealth of Australia as follows" to "The Parliament of Australia enacts".

Barristers in New South Wales (from 1993), Queensland (from 1994), ACT (from 1995), Victoria (from 2000), Western Australia (from 2001), Tasmania (from 2005), Northern Territory (from 2007), Commonwealth (from March 2007) and South Australia (from 2008) were no longer appointed Queen's Counsel (QC), but as Senior Counsel (SC). These changes were criticised by Justice Michael Kirby and other monarchists as moves to a "republic by stealth". However beginning with Queensland in 2013 and then followed by Victoria and the Commonwealth in 2014, the title of Queen's Counsel (QC) and now King's Counsel (KC) has again been conferred. Currently South Australia and New South Wales are discussing the reintroduction.

All Australian senators and members of the House of Representatives continue to swear "to be faithful and bear true allegiance to His Majesty" before taking their seats in parliament. As a part of the constitution, any changes to this oath could only be approved by a referendum.

Keating government proposals
The Australian Labor Party (ALP) first made republicanism its official policy in 1991, with then Prime Minister Bob Hawke describing a republic as "inevitable". Following the ALP decision, the Australian Republican Movement, the leading republican advocacy group, was born. Hawke's successor, Paul Keating, pursued the republican agenda much more actively than Hawke and established the Republic Advisory Committee to produce an options paper on issues relating to the possible transition to a republic to take effect on the centenary of Federation: 1 January 2001. The committee produced its report in April 1993 and in it argued that "a republic is achievable without threatening Australia's cherished democratic institutions."

In response to the report, Keating promised a referendum on the establishment of a republic, replacing the governor-general with a president, and removing references to the Australian sovereign. The president was to be nominated by the prime minister and appointed by a two-thirds majority in a joint sitting of the Senate and House of Representatives. The referendum was to be held either in 1998 or 1999. However, Keating's party lost the 1996 federal election in a landslide and he was replaced by John Howard, a monarchist, as prime minister.

1998 Constitutional Convention

With the change in government in 1996, Prime Minister John Howard proceeded with an alternative policy of holding a constitutional convention. This was held over two weeks in February 1998 at Old Parliament House. Half of the 152 delegates were elected and half were appointed by the federal and state governments. Convention delegates were asked whether or not Australia should become a republic and which model for a republic is preferred. At the opening of the convention, Howard stated that if the convention could not decide on a model to be put to a referendum, then plebiscites would be held on the model preferred by the Australian public.

At the convention, a republic gained majority support (89 votes to 52 with 11 abstentions), but the question of what model for a republic should be put to the people at a referendum produced deep divisions among republicans. Four republican models were debated: two involving direct election of the head of state; one involving appointment on the advice of the prime minister (the McGarvie Model); and one involving appointment by a two-thirds majority of parliament (the bi-partisan appointment model).

The latter was eventually successful at the convention, even though it only obtained a majority because of 22 abstentions in the final vote (57 against delegates voted against the model and 73 voted for, three votes short of an actual majority of delegates). A number of those who abstained were republicans who supported direct election (such as Ted Mack, Phil Cleary, Clem Jones, and Andrew Gunter), thereby allowing the bi-partisan model to succeed. They reasoned that the model would be defeated at a referendum and a second referendum called with direct election as the model.

The convention also made recommendations about a preamble to the constitution and a proposed preamble was also put to referendum.

According to critics, the two-week timeline and quasi-democratic composition of the convention is evidence of an attempt by John Howard to frustrate the republican cause, a claim John Howard adamantly rejects.

1999 Republican referendum

The republic referendum was held on 6 November 1999, after a national advertising campaign and the distribution of 12.9 million 'Yes/No' case pamphlets. It comprised two questions: The first asked whether Australia should become a republic in which the governor-general and monarch would be replaced by one office, the President of the Commonwealth of Australia, the occupant elected by a two-thirds vote of the Australian parliament for a fixed term. The second question, generally deemed to be far less important politically, asked whether Australia should alter the constitution to insert a preamble. Neither of the amendments passed, with 55% of all electors and all states voting 'no' to the proposed amendment; it was not carried in any state. The preamble referendum question was also defeated, with a Yes vote of only 39 per cent.

Many opinions were put forward for the defeat, some relating to perceived difficulties with the parliamentary appointment model, others relating to the lack of public engagement or that most Australians were simply happy to keep the status quo. Some republicans voted no because they did not agree with provisions such as the president being instantly dismissible by the prime minister.

2000s: Following the referendum
On 26 June 2003, the Senate referred an inquiry into an Australian republic to the Senate Legal and Constitutional References Committee. During 2004, the committee reviewed 730 submissions and conducted hearings in all state capitals. The committee tabled its report, called Road to a Republic, on 31 August 2004. The report examined the contest between minimalist and direct-election models and gave attention to hybrid models such as the electoral college model, the constitutional council model, and models having both an elected president and a governor-general.

The bi-partisan recommendations of committee supported educational initiatives and holding a series of plebiscites to allow the public to choose which model they preferred, prior to a final draft and referendum, along the lines of plebiscites proposed by John Howard at the 1998 constitutional convention.

Issues related to republicanism were raised by the March 2006 tour of Australia by Queen Elizabeth II. John Howard, still serving as prime minister, was then questioned by British journalists about the future of the Australian monarchy and there was debate about playing Australia's royal anthem, "God Save the Queen", during the opening of that year's Commonwealth Games, at which the monarch was present.

In July 2007, Opposition Leader Kevin Rudd pledged to hold a new referendum on a republic if called on to form a government. However, he stated there was no fixed time frame for such a move and that the result of the 1999 referendum must be respected. After his party won the 2007 federal election and Rudd was appointed prime minister, he stated in April 2008 that a move to a republic was "not a top-order priority".

In the lead-up to the 2010 federal election, Prime Minister Julia Gillard stated: "I believe that this nation should be a republic. I also believe that this nation has got a deep affection for Queen Elizabeth." She stated her belief that it would be appropriate for Australia to become a republic only once Queen Elizabeth II's reign ends.

2010s
In November 2013, Governor-General Quentin Bryce proclaimed her support for an Australian republic, stating in a speech: "perhaps, my friends, one day, one young girl or boy may even grow up to be our nation's first [sic] head of state." She had previously emphasised the importance of debate about the future of the Australian head of state and the evolution of the constitution.

In January 2015, Opposition Leader Bill Shorten called for a new push for a republic, stating: "Let us declare that our head of state should be one of us [sic]. Let us rally behind an Australian republic - a model that truly speaks for who we are, our modern identity, our place in our region and our world."

In September 2015, former Australian Republican Movement chair Malcolm Turnbull became leader of the Liberal Party and was appointed prime minister. He stated he would not pursue "his dream" of Australia becoming a republic until after the end of the Queen's reign, instead focusing his efforts toward the economy. Upon meeting Elizabeth II in July 2017, Turnbull declared himself an "Elizabethan" and stated he did not believe a majority of Australians would support a republic before the end of her reign.

In December 2016, News.com.au found that a slim majority of members of both houses of parliament supported Australia becoming a republic (54% in the House and 53% in the Senate).

In July 2017, Opposition Leader Bill Shorten revealed that, should the Labor Party be elected to a plurality in the 2019 federal election, they would legislate for a compulsory plebiscite on the issue. Should that plebiscite be supported by a majority of Australians, a second vote would be held, this time a referendum, asking the public for their support for a specific model of government. Labor lost the election.

2020s
Following Labor's victory in the 2022 federal election, the new Prime Minister, Anthony Albanese, appointed Matt Thistlethwaite to the newly created office of Assistant Minister for the Republic, signalling a commitment to prepare Australia for a transition to republic following the next election. After the death of Elizabeth II, former prime minister Julia Gillard opined that Australia would inevitably choose to be a republic, but agreed with Albanese's timing on debate about the matter. When asked if he supported another referendum following the Queen's death, Albanese stated it was "not the time" to discuss a republic.

Arguments for change

Independence and head of state

A central argument made by Australian republicans is that, as Australia is an independent country, it is inappropriate and anomalous for Australia to share the person of its monarch with the United Kingdom. Republicans argue that the Australian monarch is not Australian and, as a national and resident of another country, cannot adequately represent Australia or Australian national aspirations, either to itself or to the rest of the world. Former Chief Justice Gerard Brennan stated that "so long as we retain the existing system our head of state is determined for us essentially by the parliament at Westminster". As Australian Republican Movement member Frank Cassidy put it in a speech on the issue: "In short, we want a resident for President."

Multiculturalism and sectarianism
Some republicans associate the monarchy with British identity and argue that Australia has changed demographically and culturally, from being "British to our bootstraps", as prime minister Sir Robert Menzies once put it, to being less British in nature (albeit maintaining an "English Core"). Many Australian republicans are of non-British ancestry, and feel no connection to the "mother country" to speak of. According to an Australian government inquiry, arguments put forth by these republicans include the claim that the idea of one person being both monarch of Australia and of the United Kingdom is an anomaly.

However, monarchists argue that immigrants who left unstable republics and have arrived in Australia since 1945 welcomed the social and political stability that they found in Australia under a constitutional monarchy. Further, some Aboriginal Australians, such as former Senator Neville Bonner, said a republican president would not "care one jot more for my people".

It has also been claimed monarchism and republicanism in Australia delineate historical and persistent sectarian tensions with, broadly speaking, Catholics more likely to be republicans and Protestants more likely to be monarchists. This developed out of a historical cleavage in 19th- and 20th-century Australia, in which republicans were predominantly of Irish Catholic background and loyalists were predominantly of British Protestant background. Whilst mass immigration since the Second World War has diluted this conflict, the Catholic–Protestant divide has been cited as a dynamic in the republic debate, particularly in relation to the referendum campaign in 1999. Nonetheless, others have stated that Catholic–Protestant tensions—at least in the sense of an Irish–British conflict—are at least forty years dead.

It has also been claimed, however, that the Catholic–Protestant divide is intermingled with class issues. Republicanism in Australia has traditionally been supported most strongly by members of the urban working class with Irish Catholic backgrounds, whereas monarchism is a core value associated with urban and rural inhabitants of British Protestant heritage and the middle class, to the extent that there were calls in 1999 for 300,000 exceptionally enfranchised British subjects who were not Australian citizens to be barred from voting on the grounds that they would vote as a loyalist bloc in a tight referendum.

Social values and contemporary Australia
From some perspectives, it has been argued that several characteristics of the monarchy are in conflict with modern Australian values. The hereditary nature of the monarchy is said to conflict with egalitarianism and dislike of inherited privilege. The laws of succession were, before amendment to them in 2015, held by some to be sexist and the links between the monarchy and the Church of England inconsistent with Australia's secular character. Under the Act of Settlement, the monarch is prohibited from being a Catholic. As it is constitutional, this Australian law over-rides anti-discrimination laws, which prohibit arrangements under which becoming a Catholic invalidates any legal rights.

Proposals for change
A typical proposal for an Australian republic provides for the King and governor-general to be replaced by a president or an executive federal council. There is much debate on the appointment or election process that would be used and what role such an office would have.

Methods for deciding a head of state
Election
by a popular vote of all Australian citizens;
by the federal parliament alone;
by federal and state parliaments;
by a hybrid process of popular and parliamentary votes.
 Selection
by the prime minister;
by consensus among the government and opposition;
by a constitutional council.

An alternative minimalist approach to change provides for removing the sovereign and retaining the governor-general. The most notable model of this type is the McGarvie Model, while Copernican models replace the monarch with a directly elected figurehead. These Copernican models allow for regular and periodic elections for the office of head of state while limiting the reserve powers to the appointed governor-general only. A popularly elected head of state would have the same powers as the monarch, but he or she could not dismiss the prime minister. If this were to happen, it would be a first, as all other former Commonwealth realms have created presidencies upon becoming republics. Alternatively it has been proposed to abolish the roles of the governor-general and the monarchy and have their functions exercised by other constitutional officers such as the Speaker.

Another such model is the 50/50 model. This model is supported and created by Anthony Cianflone – LFAR Grassroots Member. A new President of Australia would become Head of State after being elected under a 50-50 model i.e. 50 per cent of the vote would be elected by the Australian people and 50 per cent of the vote would be elected by a joint sitting of the Australian Parliament. The President of Australia would play a similar ceremonial role to the Governor General. However under the 50-50 model the President would be more than just a ceremonial figure. The vision is for the Australian President to act as Australia's ‘Social Conscience and Moral Compass’. The President would have the capacity to influence and campaign on non-partisan issues such as Aboriginal Policy, Veterans’ Affairs, Education, Health, Environment, Human Rights, Multiculturalism, Domestic Violence, Homelessness, Poverty, Disabilities, Youth, Women, Arts, Tourism, Families, Older Australians and Sport. Whilst not having the power to veto bills, prior to providing Presidential assent, the Constitution could allow for the President to review and seek further clarification, and information on bills from the Parliament based on a ‘Social and Moral Conscience Charter’. The President's annual ‘State of the Nation’ Address’ to Parliament would provide one of the key formal mechanisms for the President to relay to Parliamentarians the priorities and expectation of Australians in relation to the non-partisan issues, and help improve the quality and consistency of policy reforms, parliamentary debates and community outcomes over the lifetime of different governments.

A major problem for the popular election model has been that an election for a popularly elected head of state is likely to see the major political parties endorse partisan candidates.  Gough Whitlam has observed, that this would almost guarantee the election of a politician as head of state. Some commentators have therefore sought to develop non-partisan popular electoral models. Michael Duffy, along with co-authors Steve Perryman and Anthony Cianflone, have floated the concept of 'tri-partisan endorsement' of a candidate by the three largest parties, who would then face a national popular vote. This idea, which is an evolution of a proposal by George Winterton made after the failed 1999 referendum, seeks to deliver a politically neutral head of state who will be a symbol of unity. It involves constitutional provisions that would bind the major political parties to such endorsement. Another proposal is the ‘Jones-Pickering Model’ developed by Benjamin Jones and Paul Pickering. Under this model, eight different candidates are nominated by two-thirds of a joint sitting of each of the six state and two territory parliaments and then each go on to a popular national vote.

Australians for Constitutional Monarchy and the Australian Monarchist League argue that no model is better than the present system and argue that the risk and difficulty of changing the constitution is best demonstrated by inability of republicans to back a definitive design.

Process models

From its foundation until the 1999 referendum, the Australian Republican Movement (ARM) supported the bi-partisan appointment model, which would result in a President elected by the Parliament of Australia, with the powers currently held by the Governor-General. It is argued that the requirement of a two-thirds majority in a vote of both houses of parliament would result in a bi-partisan appointment, preventing a party politician from becoming president.

The ARM now supports a non-binding plebiscite to decide the model, followed by a binding referendum to amend the Constitution, reflecting the model chosen. Opponents of holding non-binding plebiscites include monarchist David Flint, who described this process as "inviting a vote of no confidence in one of the most successful constitutions in the world," and minimalist republican Greg Craven, who states "a multi-option plebiscite inevitably will produce a direct election model, precisely for the reason that such a process favours models with shallow surface appeal and multiple flaws. Equally inevitably, such a model would be doomed at referendum."

An additional proposal from academic Jesse John Fleay suggests a dual referendum on both the republic and the Indigenous Voice to Parliament, as outlined in the Uluru Statement from the Heart.

Uniquely Australian monarch

A far less prominent suggestion is that Australia should have a uniquely Australian monarch, who would reside permanently in Australia. The first known publication of this idea was in 1867. One suggestion has been that someone who was in line for Australian and British throne, but who is not expected to become monarch of the United Kingdom, would become monarch. There are thousands of people in line to the Australian throne. Some Canadian monarchists have suggested that all the Commonwealth realms, including Australia,  should have their own resident monarchs. Australian status quo monarchist organisations have in general not supported this idea, but there is a website that does.

Public opinion

Polls and surveys generate different responses depending on the wording of the questions, mostly in regards the type of republic, and often appear contradictory.

In 2009, the Australian Electoral Survey that is conducted following all elections by the Australian National University has found that support for a republic has remained reasonably static since 1987 at around 60%, if the type of republic is not part of the question. The Electoral Survey also shows that support or opposition is relatively weak: 31% strongly support a republic while only 10% strongly oppose. Roy Morgan research has indicated that support for the monarchy has been supported by a majority of Australians since 2010, with support for a republic being in the majority between 1999 and 2004.

An opinion poll held in November 2008 that separated the questions found support for a republic at 50% with 28% opposed. Asked how the president should be chosen if there were to be a republic, 80 percent said elected by the people, against 12 percent who favoured appointment by parliament. In October 2009, another poll by UMR found 59% support for a republic and 33% opposition. 73% supported direct election, versus 18% support for parliamentary appointment.

On 29 August 2010, The Sydney Morning Herald published a poll produced by Neilson, asking multiple questions on the future of the monarchy:
48% of the 1400 respondents were opposed to constitutional change (a rise of 8 per cent since 2008)
44% supported change (a drop of 8 per cent since 2008).
But when asked which of the following statements best described their view:
31% said Australia should never become a republic.
29% said Australia should become a republic as soon as possible.
34% said Australia should become a republic only after Queen Elizabeth II's reign ends.

A survey of 1,000 readers of The Sun-Herald and The Sydney Morning Herald, published in The Sydney Morning Herald on 21 November 2010, found 68% of respondents were in favour of Australia becoming a republic, while 25% said it should not. More than half the respondents, 56%, said Australia should become a republic as soon as possible while 31% said it should happen after the Queen dies.

However, an opinion poll conducted in 2011 saw a sharp decline in the support for an Australian republic. The polling conducted by the Morgan Poll in May 2011 showed the support for the monarchy was now 55% (up 17% since 1999), whereas the support for a republic was at 34% (down 20%). The turnaround in support for a republic has been called the "strange death of Australian republicanism".

The Australian Broadcasting Corporation's Vote Compass during the 2013 Australian federal election found that 40.4% of respondents disagreed with the statement "Australia should end the monarchy and become a republic", whilst 38.1% agreed (23.1% strongly agreed) and 21.5% were neutral. Support for a republic was highest among those with a left-leaning political ideology. Younger people had the highest rate for those neutral towards the statement (27.8%) with their support for strongly agreed the lowest of all age groups at 17.1%. Support for a republic was highest in the Australian Capital Territory and Victoria and lowest in Queensland and Western Australia. More men than women said they support a republic.

In early 2014, a ReachTEL poll of 2,146 Australian conducted just after Australia Day showed only 39.4% supported a republic with 41.6% opposed. Lowest support was in the 65+ year cohort followed by the 18–34-year cohort. Geoff Gallop, the then chairman of the Australian Republican Movement, said higher support for a republic among Generation X and baby boomer voters could be explained by them having participated in the 1999 referendum and remembering the 1975 constitutional crisis.

In April 2014, a poll found that "support for an Australian republic has slumped to its lowest level in more than three decades"; namely, on the eve of the visit to Australia by the Duke and Duchess of Cambridge, and Prince George, 42% of those polled agreed with the statement that "Australia should become a republic", whereas 51% opposed.

ARM commissioned a poll to be conducted by Essential Research from 5 to 8 November in 2015, asking "When Prince Charles becomes King of Australia, will you support or oppose replacing the British monarch with an Australian citizen as Australia's head of state?" Of the 1008 participants, 51% said they would prefer an Australian head of state to "King Charles", 27% opposed and 22% were undecided.

The Australian has polled the same question "Are you personally in favour or against Australia becoming a republic?" multiple times since 1999. After Australia Day 2016 they found 51% support. This level of support was similar to levels found between 1999 and 2003 by the same newspaper. Total against was 37% which was an increase over the rates polled in all previous polls other than 2011. Uncommitted at 12% was the lowest ever polled. However support for a republic was again lowest in the 18–34-year cohort.

In November 2018, Newspoll found support for a republic had collapsed to 40%. It was also the first time in their polling since the 1999 referendum that support for the monarchy was higher than a republic. A July 2020 YouGov poll found 62% of Australians believed Australia's head of state should be an Australian, not Queen Elizabeth II. An Ipsos poll in January 2021 found support for a republic was 34%, the lowest since 1979. However, one conducted by Ipsos in December 2022 (after the death of the Queen) showed support for the republic had risen to 54% (see above reference.)

Party political positions

Liberal-National Coalition
The Liberal Party is a conservative and arguably a classical liberal party. It has no official position on the issue of monarchy, but both republicans and monarchists have held prominent positions within the party.

Proponents of republicanism in the Liberal Party include Malcolm Turnbull (a former leader, Prime Minister, and Australian Republican Movement leader), late former Prime Minister Malcolm Fraser, former opposition leader John Hewson, former Premiers Gladys Berejiklian (of NSW), Mike Baird (of NSW) and Jeff Kennett (of Victoria), former deputy leader Julie Bishop, and former federal Treasurers Joe Hockey and Peter Costello.

Supporters of the status quo include former Prime Ministers Scott Morrison, Tony Abbott (who led Australians for Constitutional Monarchy from 1992 to 1994), John Howard (whose government oversaw the 1999 referendum), and former opposition leaders Alexander Downer and Brendan Nelson.

The National Party officially supports the status quo, but there have been some republicans within the party, such as former leader Tim Fischer.

Under then Prime Minister John Howard, a monarchist, the government initiated a process to settle the republican debate, involving a constitutional convention and a referendum. Howard says the matter was resolved by the failure of the referendum.

Australian Labor Party
The Labor Party has supported constitutional change to become a republic since 1991 and has incorporated republicanism into its platform. Labor is currently the only party that proposes a series of plebiscites to restart the republican process. Along with this, Labor spokesperson (and former federal attorney general) Nicola Roxon has previously said that reform will "always fail if we seek to inflict a certain option on the public without their involvement. This time round, the people must shape the debate". In the 2019 federal election, Labor's platform included a two-stage referendum on a republic to be held during the next parliamentary term; however, Labor was defeated in the election.

Greens
The Greens party is a strong proponent for an Australian republic, and this is reflected in the Greens 'Constitutional Reform & Democracy' policy. In 2009, the Greens proposed legislation to hold a plebiscite on a republic at the 2010 federal election. The bill was subject to a Senate inquiry, which made no recommendation on the subject, and the proposal was subsequently dropped.

Democrats
The Australian Democrats, Australia's third party from the 1970s until the 2000s, strongly supported a move towards a republic through a system of an elected Head of State through popular voting.

See also

Structured Debate on Australia becoming a Republic
Australians for Constitutional Monarchy
Australian Monarchist League
Australian Republican Movement
Australian Constitutional history
Australian constitutional law
Constitution of Australia
Process model (Australia)
Australian flag debate
Australian head of state dispute
Quebec sovereignty movement
Republicanism in Barbados
Republicanism in Canada
Republicanism in Jamaica
Republicanism in New Zealand
Republicanism in the United Kingdom

References

Citations

Bibliography

An Australian republic: The options: the report of the Republic Advisory Committee, Parliamentary paper / Parliament of the Commonwealth of Australia (1993)
Booker, M., A Republic of Australia: What Would it Mean, Left Book Club Co-operative Ltd, Sydney (1992)
Costella, John P., A Republic For All Australians (2004) online version
Duffy, M. Perryman, S. and Cianflone, A. "Parliamentary appointment or popular election? Breaking the impasse on models for an Australian ‘Westminster Republic’" (2018) 29 Public Law Review 147)Public Law Review update: Vol 29 Pt 2.
Flint,David, The Cane Toad Republic Wakefield Press (1999)
Goot, Murray, "Contingent Inevitability: Reflections on the Prognosis for Republicanism" (1994) in George Winterton (ed), We, the People: Australian Republican Government (1994), pp 63–96
Hirst, John., A Republican Manifesto, Oxford University Press (1994)
Jones, Benjamin T, This Time: Australia’s Republican Past and Future, Schwartz Publishing Pty Ltd 2018
Keating, P. J., An Australian Republic: The Way Forward, Australian Government Publishing Service (1995)
Mackay, Hugh, Turning Point. Australians Choosing Their Future, Pan Macmillan, Sydney, New South Wales, C. 18, 'Republic. The people have their say.' (1999)  
McGarvie, Richard E., Democracy: Choosing Australia's Republic (1999)
McKenna, Mark, The Captive Republic: A History of Republicanism in Australia 1788–1996 (1998)
McKenna, Mark, The Traditions of Australian Republicanism (1996) online version
McKenna, Mark, The Nation Reviewed (March 2008, The Monthly) online version
Stephenson, M. and Turner, C. (eds.), Australia Republic or Monarchy? Legal and Constitutional Issues, University of Queensland Press (1994)
Vizard, Steve, Two Weeks in Lilliput: Bear Baiting and Backbiting At the Constitutional Convention (Penguin, 1998)
Warden, J., "The Fettered Republic: The Anglo American Commonwealth and the Traditions of Australian Political Thought," Australian Journal of Political Science, Vol. 28, 1993. pp. 84–85.
Wark, McKenzie, The Virtual Republic: Australia's Culture Wars of the 1990s (1998)
Winterton, George. Monarchy to Republic: Australian Republican Government Oxford University Press (1986).
Winterton, George (ed), We, the People: Australian Republican Government, Allen & Unwin (1994),
Woldring, Klaas,  Australia: Republic or US Colony? (2006)

External links
Senate Inquiry into an Australian Republic
Souters' Guide to Australian Republican Issues
The Australian Republican Movement homepage
The Australian Monarchist League (Opposed to republicanism)
Australians for Constitutional Monarchy (Opposed to republicanism)
Advancing Democracy Model for a Republic
Australia day poll report 
 

 
Australia